Donald W. Braben is a British author and Honorary Professor in the Office of the Vice-Provost (Research), University College London.

Education
Braben was educated at the University of Liverpool where he was awarded a PhD in 1962 for work on Isotopes of sodium.

Research
Braben is a well-known advocate of academic freedom, blue skies research, and the culture of science.  Braben is the author of "To Be a Scientist: The Spirit of Adventure in Science and Technology", (OUP 1994), Pioneering Research: A Risk Worth Taking (Wiley 2004) and Scientific Freedom: The Elixir of Civilization (Wiley 2008), Promoting the Planck Club. How defiant youth, irreverent researchers and liberated universities can foster prosperity indefinitely (Wiley 2014). Scientific Freedom: The Elixir of Civilisation was republished by Stripe Press in 2020 with a new Introduction. Braben is now trying to persuade universities to recreate the considerable success he has had with the BP sponsored  Venture Research Unit (1980–90), and later at University College London (2009 - ). Venture Research is the research that has a good chance of radically changing the way we think in an important field and is selected in face-to-face discussion.

References

British science writers
British physicists
1935 births
Living people